"Girls" is a song written by David Bowie and originally recorded by Tina Turner for her 1986 album Break Every Rule. It was released as a single the same year, where it became a top 20 hit in Europe. Bowie recorded his own studio version of the track during his 1987 Never Let Me Down recording sessions, and released the track as the B-side to his 1987 single "Time Will Crawl".

Tina Turner version
"Girls" was written by David Bowie and Erdal Kızılçay and produced by Terry Britten. It was released as a single in 1986. Tina Turner released a live version of the song on her album Tina Live in Europe (1988).  Phil Collins plays drums on this song.

David Bowie version
Bowie later recorded his own version of the song during the Never Let Me Down (1987) sessions, including one track with vocals sung in English and another with vocals sung in Japanese. The song was originally intended to appear on the album itself, but instead both versions appeared as B-sides for different formats of the "Time Will Crawl" single in June 1987; the "extended edit" of the English-language song also appeared as a bonus track on the 1995 Virgin Records reissue of Never Let Me Down, and later on the box set Loving the Alien (1983-1988).

Critical reception
The song was critiqued by Bowie biographer Nicholas Pegg, who, though he considered it better than some of the lesser tracks on the album, found that it "[degenerated] into a standard Never Let Me Down sax-and-guitar romp". Pegg noted influences on the lyrics and musical composition of "Girls" that include Bowie's earlier work "Andy Warhol", Ennio Morricone's "Chi Mai" and even the sci-fi movie Blade Runner (1982).

Charts

References 

1987 singles
Tina Turner songs
David Bowie songs
Songs written by David Bowie
Songs written by Erdal Kızılçay
1986 songs